In chemistry, metal aquo complexes are coordination compounds containing metal ions with only water as a ligand. These complexes are the predominant species in aqueous solutions of many metal salts, such as metal nitrates, sulfates, and perchlorates. They have the general stoichiometry .  Their behavior underpins many aspects of environmental, biological, and industrial chemistry. This article focuses on complexes where water is the only ligand ("homoleptic aquo complexes"), but of course many complexes are known to consist of a mix of aquo and other ligands.

Stoichiometry and structure

Hexa-aquo complexes

The water molecules function as Lewis bases, donating a pair of electrons to the metal ion and forming a dative covalent bond with it. Typical examples are listed in the following table. 
{| class=wikitable style=text-align:center
!Complex!!colour!!electron config.!! distance (Å)||water exchangerate (s−1, 25 °C)!!M2+/3+ self-exchangerate (M−1s−1, 25 °C)
|-
|
| violet
| (t2g)1
|2.025
|
|
|-
|  
| violet
| (t2g)3
|2.12
|
|fast
|-
|  
| green
| (t2g)2
|1.991
|
|fast
|-
| 
| blue
| (t2g)3(eg)1
|2.06 and 2.33
|
|slow
|-
| 
| violet
| (t2g)3
|1.961
|
|slow
|-
| 
| pale pink
| (t2g)3(eg)2
|2.177
|
|
|-
| 
| pale blue-green
| (t2g)4(eg)2
|2.095
|
|fast
|-
| 
| pale violet
| (t2g)3(eg)2
|1.990
|
|fast 
|-
| 
| pink
| (t2g)5(eg)2
|2.08
|
|
|-
| 
| green
| (t2g)6(eg)2
|2.05
|
|
|-
| 
| blue
| (t2g)6(eg)3
|1.97 and 2.30
|
|
|-
| 
| colorless
| (t2g)6(eg)4
| 2.03-2.10
| fast
|
|-
|}

Alums, are also double salts. Both sets of salts contain hexa-aquo metal cations.

Tetra-aquo complexes
Silver(I) forms , a rare example of a tetrahedral aquo complex. Palladium(II) and platinum(II) were once thought to form square planar aquo complexes.

Octa- and nona- aquo complexes
Aquo complexes of lanthanide(III) ions are eight- and nine-coordinate, reflecting the large size of the metal centres.

Binuclear-aquo complexes

In the binuclear ion  each bridging water molecule donates one pair of electrons to one cobalt ion and another pair to the other cobalt ion. The Co-O (bridging) bond lengths are 213 picometers, and the Co-O (terminal) bond lengths are 10 pm shorter.

The complexes  and  contain metal-metal bonds.

Hydroxo- and oxo- complexes of aquo ions
Monomeric aquo complexes of Nb, Ta, Mo, W, Mn, Tc, Re, and Os in oxidation states +4 to +7 have not been reported. For example,  is unknown: the hydrolyzed species  is the principal species in dilute solutions. With the higher oxidation states the effective electrical charge on the cation is further reduced by the formation of oxo-complexes.

Aquo complexes of the lanthanide cations
Lanthanide salts often or perhaps characteristically form aquo complexes.  The homoleptic tricationic aquo complexes have nine water ligands.

Reactions
Some reactions considered fundamental to the behavior of metal aquo ions are ligand exchange, electron-transfer, and acid-base reactions.

Water exchange
Ligand exchange involves replacement of a water ligand ("coordinated water") with water in solution ("bulk water"). Often the process is represented using labeled water :

In the absence of isotopic labeling, the reaction is degenerate, meaning that the free energy change is zero.

Rates vary over many orders of magnitude. The main factor affecting rates is charge: highly charged metal aquo cations exchange their water more slowly than singly charged cations. Water exchange usually follows a dissociative substitution pathway, so the rate constants indicate first order reactions.

Electron exchange
This reaction usually applies to the interconversion of di- and trivalent metal ions, which involves the exchange of only one electron. The process is called self-exchange, meaning that the ion appears to exchange electrons with itself. The standard electrode potential for the following equilibrium:

{| class="wikitable"
|+ Standard redox potential for the couple M2+, M3+ (V)
! V!!Cr!!Mn!!Fe!!Co
|-
| −0.26||−0.41||+1.51||+0.77||+1.82
|}
shows the increasing stability of the lower oxidation state as atomic number increases. The very large value for the manganese couple is a consequence of the fact that octahedral manganese(II) has zero crystal field stabilization energy (CFSE) but manganese(III) has 3 units of CFSE.

Using labels to keep track of the metals, the self-exchange process is written as:

The rates of electron exchange vary widely, the variations being attributable to differing reorganization energies: when the 2+ and 3+ ions differ widely in structure, the rates tend to be slow. The electron transfer reaction proceeds via an outer sphere electron transfer. Most often large reorganizational energies are associated with changes in the population of the eg level, at least for octahedral complexes.

Acid–base reactions
Solutions of metal aquo complexes are acidic owing to the ionization of protons from the water ligands. In dilute solution chromium(III) aquo complex has a pKa of about 4.3:

Thus, the aquo ion is a weak acid, of comparable strength to acetic acid (pKa of about 4.8). This pKa is typical of the trivalent ions. This effect is related to the stabilization of the pi-donor hydroxide ligand by the (t2g)5 Ru(III) centre.

In concentrated solutions, some metal hydroxo complexes undergo condensation reactions, known as olation, to form polymeric species. Many minerals are assumed to form via olation. Aquo ions of divalent metal ions are less acidic than those of trivalent cations.

The hydrolyzed species often exhibit very different properties from the precursor hexaaquo complex.

See also 
 Hydration number
 Ligand field theory
 Metal ammine complex

References

Coordination complexes
Inorganic chemistry
Water chemistry